Souley Vegan is a vegan soul food restaurant group based in Oakland, California in the United States. Their flagship restaurant is in Oakland, with additional locations in Los Angeles, Las Vegas, and San Francisco. It is owned by chef-founder Tamearra Dyson.

History

Tamearra Dyson opened Souley Vegan in Oakland in 2009. Dyson, a single mother attending nursing school while working in healthcare, has been vegan since she was seventeen. She began cooking vegan food for the general public at a local farmers market in 2006. In 2009, she quit her healthcare job and opened Souley Vegan in West Oakland.  She completely funded the opening herself without investors. To this day, Souley Vegan remains solely funded by the business itself, no investors. Dyson's made her mission to educate the Black community on how to eat healthfully. Initially, Souley Vegan's guests were 95% white. As of 202, 60% of her customers are Black.

During the COVID-19 pandemic in the San Francisco Bay Area in early 2020, which called for the closure of in-house dining for restaurants across the region, Souley Vegan saw a 70% decline in business. 

In July 2020, Dyson announced that she would open three take out and delivery restaurants in California, specifically in West Hollywood, San Francisco, and a second Oakland location. The San Francisco and East Hollywood locations opened in August 2020, and a second Oakland location opened in September 2020. The following year, in September 2021, Dyson shared that she would open a sister restaurant, The Back Porch, behind her flagship Souley Vegan in Oakland. The Back Porch serves cocktails and upscale vegan Cajun food.

Architecture and design

The flagship Souley Vegan, at 301 Broadway in East Oakland, is located in the oldest building in Oakland. The building was built in 1857 our of brick and plaster in the simplified Italianate style.

Cuisine

Souley Vegan specializes in vegan soul food. As of 2020, sides averaged $5.50 and entrees ranged from $11-$14. Entrees include seitan steaks and mashed potatoes, crispy seitan and waffles, and a Southern Staples Bowl with grits, jambalaya, and roasted zucchini étouffée. Souley Vegan also sells sandwiches, including the Toasty Crispy: cornmeal crusted tofu topped with barbecued tofu, barbecue sauce, garlic sauce, and spicy seasoning. The most popular dish at the Oakland location is the Soul Food Platter, which includes southern fried tofu, red beans and rice, and macaroni and cheese made with cashew cream. Side offerings at Souley Vegan include vegan macaroni and cheese and collard greens.

Souley Vegan makes all their own vegan sauces, proteins and cheeses. All of their food is natural, with no additives. Produce is sourced from local, Black-owned farm Acta Non Verba Farms.

Reception

In 2021, VegNews called Souley Vegan "one of the premier vegan soul food restaurants in the country." The restaurant was featured on Diners, Drive-Ins, and Dives in 2016 and ''Check, Please! Bay Area.

See also 

 List of Black-owned restaurants

References

External links
Souley Vegan's Food Network entry

2009 establishments in the United States
Black-owned companies of the United States
Buildings and structures in Oakland, California
Culture of Oakland, California
Restaurants in Las Vegas, Nevada
Restaurants in Los Angeles
Restaurants in San Francisco
Restaurants in the San Francisco Bay Area
Soul food restaurants in the United States
Vegan restaurants in the United States